Felicita Casella née Lacombe (c. 1820–after 1865) was an Italian singer and composer of French birth. She was born at Bourges, the sister of Louis Lacombe. Before 1849 she married Italian cellist and composer Cesare Casella and moved with him to Oporto.

Her opera Haydée was performed in Oporto in 1849 and again at the Teatro Dona Maria in Lisbon in 1853, where Casella sang in the principal role. Her next opera Cristoforo Colombo was performed in 1865 at the Théâtre Impérial in Nice.

Works
Casella composed two operas and other works including romances and pieces for voice and piano. Selected works include:
Haydée, Portuguese opera (also Haidée, libretto by Luiz Felipe Leite after Alexandre Dumas’ Le Comte de Monte Cristo) 1849
Cristoforo Colombo, opera (libretto by Felice Romani) 1865
Marcia funebre (for Maria II) for piano
Ave verum for voice and piano

References

19th-century classical composers
Women classical composers
Italian classical composers
Year of death missing
Year of birth uncertain
Italian opera composers
19th-century Italian composers
Women opera composers
19th-century women composers